Water Tower Leverkusen-Bürrig is a  water tower built in 1978 in Leverkusen-Bürrig. It has a water reservoir of two chambers each of 4000 cubic metres, with a diameter of 42 metres. It has an observation deck for visitors.

Reference

External links
 http://www.leverkusen.com/guide/index.php?view=00150
 

Towers completed in 1978
Buildings and structures in Leverkusen
Water towers in Germany